Olalekan Sanusi Salami (1928 - 1988) was a Nigerian businessman, football administrator and socialite who was life patron of Shooting Stars S.C. and was influential in the success of the club during the 1970s. The former Adamasingba Sports Complex is named after him.

Life
Salami was born in Ibadan to the family of Salami and Oyebimpe Oyetunde, his father was a younger brother to the late Olubadan Shittu Akintola Oyetunde. The family's compound was in the Eleta neighborhood of Ibadan, hence he was given the moniker Salami Eleta when he was young. He started learning by taking Quranic lessons at the age of three and when he was seven, he started attending an Islamic School. He later attended Ibadan Boys High School and Lisabi Grammar School, Abeokuta.

First republic politics
In 1950, Salami was secretary of the Ibadan Cooperative Produce Marketing Union a role that involved the grading and payment for produce brought in by cooperative members. After his stint with the cooperative, he later worked with UAC. During the pre-independence period, Salami joined the Mabolaje Alliance of Adegoke Adelabu. In 1954, he won election as a councilor to the Ibadan District Council under the banner of NCNC and in 1956, he went on to win an election into the Western House of Assembly, defeating the incumbent, Akinloye. After the death of Adelabu in 1958, a crisis within the Ibadan NCNC branch led to the exit of Salami from NCNC. Thereafter, he aligned with Action Group and was a member of Akintola's faction. He was elected back into the Ibadan District Council in 1961 and was later appointed as executive director, Western Nigeria Development Corporation. After the military coup of January 15, 1966, Salami was placed in detention for five months before he was freed by soldiers during the counter-coup of July 1966.

Relationship with Shooting Stars
Salami had been a fan of many amateur local football clubs since 1937 when the first amateur team in Ibadan, Hercules club was founded. In the 1950s, he was a member of the Ibadan District Football Association, an organization that managed Ibadan Lions football club. During his time with the group, he was a team manager of the lions and later president of the association. His appointment to the Western Nigeria Sports Council led to his resignation from the association due to potential conflict of interest. But while in the association, he joined a group of young members such as J.O. Obi and supported remuneration for football players during a time football in the city was still at an amateur stage and players had part-time work and sometimes bought their own equipment. In 1963, when he was appointed an executive director with Western Nigeria Development Corporation. At WNDC, he helped launch the Ibadan-based WNDC Sports club later known as WNDC Shooting Stars, IICC Shooting Stars and 3SC. Prior to 1963, the club was known as Pepsi-Cola FC then managed by Pepsi-Cola. He was actively involved in recruiting many players to the club including, Jide Johnson, Godwin Etemeke, Muda Lawal. In the 1970s, the club won the continental cup. His relationship with the club earned him the title of life patron of the shooting stars.

Salami owned a textile mill in Lagos and was a director of Solel Boneh, Nigeria.

References

Sources

Politicians from Ibadan
Businesspeople from Ibadan
1928 births
1988 deaths
People educated at Lisabi Grammar School